Sound Off is a 1952 comedy film featuring several songs, filmed in SuperCinecolor for Columbia Pictures and starring Mickey Rooney. The film was shot in August 1951.

This was the first of a three-picture contract between Rooney and producer Jonie Taps for Columbia, in which Rooney was paid $75,000 for each picture. It is also the first collaboration between Richard Quine, Blake Edwards and Dick Crockett.  The same team next collaborated with Rooney in the Navy in All Ashore made the following year.  The three worked together again on Rooney's television series The Mickey Rooney Show/Hey, Mulligan in 1954–55. Their final film in the Columbia contract was the black and white crime drama Drive a Crooked Road.

The film's title comes from the military cadence by Willie Lee Duckworth that was a major 1951 chart hit for Vaughn Monroe.

Plot
An obnoxious nightclub comedian at Ciro's is drafted into the U.S. Army during the Korean War. At his arrival at his basic training he meets a WAC Lieutenant and romantically pursues her.  His activities irritate his drill sergeant and the entire army when he goes AWOL (Absent Without Official Leave) for her.  He is imprisoned and sentenced to thirty days hard labour that turns him into a soldier. Then he is shipped overseas to join the Special Services.

Cast
 Mickey Rooney as Mike Donnelly
 Anne James as Lt. Rafferty
 John Archer as Maj. Whitlock
 Gordon Jones as Sgt. Crockett

References

External links
 

1952 films
1950s English-language films
Films directed by Richard Quine
Military humor in film
1952 comedy films
Columbia Pictures films
Cinecolor films
American comedy films
1950s American films